Robert Joseph Duffy (born September 26, 1940) is a retired American professional basketball player and college coach. He played college basketball at Colgate University, and was selected as the 10th overall pick in the 1962 NBA draft. He graduated as the leading scorer in school history, and his record 1,591 points stood for 19 years. Duffy was also a Helms Athletic Foundation All-American in 1962.

In his three NBA seasons, Duffy averaged 4.3 points and 1.1 rebounds per game. He eventually became the head coach of his alma mater and compiled an overall record of 25–43 in three seasons. In his later life, he founded Duffy Broadcasting.

Head coaching record

References

External links
Bob Duffy at TheDraftReview.com
Hall of Honor entry at Colgate University

1940 births
Living people
American men's basketball players
Basketball players from New York (state)
Colgate Raiders men's basketball coaches
Colgate Raiders men's basketball players
College men's basketball head coaches in the United States
Detroit Pistons players
John Jay High School (Cross River, New York) alumni
New York Knicks players
People from Cold Spring, New York
Point guards
St. Louis Hawks draft picks
St. Louis Hawks players